Barbarito Díez (December 4, 1909 – May 6, 1995) was a Cuban singer who specialized in danzón. He began his career as the singer for Graciano Gómez and Isaac Oviedo's son group, before joining Antonio María Romeu's orchestra. As the lead vocalist for Romeu's ensemble for 20 years, he established himself as one of the main exponents of the sung danzón. He continued singing with his own charanga, as well as other groups, for another 30 years. He also toured and recorded in Venezuela and Puerto Rico before retiring in the early 1990s, when complications from diabetes prevented him from performing and eventually resulted in his death in 1995. A naturally-gifted tenor, he was known for his sense of rhythm, correct diction and romantic style.

Early life
Bárbaro Díez Junco was born on December 4, 1909, in a sugar cane mill located in the small settlement of Bolondrón in Matanzas Province, as the only child  born to Eugenio Díez and Salustiana del Junco. When he was four years old, Díez moved with his parents to Manatí, Oriente Province, where his father worked in another mill for years. The family lived in a batey, where the young Díez attended elementary school and intuitively began to sing the repertoire of songs that Trio Matamoros had created.

Professional career
As a result, Díez established himself as a well-respected, professional performer in his Oriente Province home at the age of fourteen. He then moved to Havana in 1930, in search of better working conditions and remuneration. Even though he formed a successful guitar trio along with Graciano Gómez and Isaac Oviedo a year later, Díez received an invitation from pianist and composer Antonio María Romeu to join his dance band in 1935, where he continued thereafter as its main soloist. After Romeu died in 1955, the orchestra continued playing under the leadership of his son Antonio María Romeu Jr. with Díez as lead singer. Some years later the band was renamed Orquesta de Barbarito Díez.

During his career, Díez toured the Dominican Republic, Mexico, Puerto Rico, Venezuela and the United States in concerts and recorded eleven albums of his extensive repertoire of danzón music, well on his way to becoming a household name outside of Cuba. In addition, strengthened by a considerably large and stable fanbase in Venezuela, Díez thanked his audience for their support and offered a collection of diverse Venezuelan music genres in his albums Barbarito Díez canta a Venezuela Volumes 1 & 2, which were released in 1977 and 1980, respectively. He then recorded a handful of Latin American songs backed by the group Rondalla Venezolana in 1985. Three years later, he made his last recording session with the Charanga Típica orchestra directed by Guillermo Rubalcaba.

Late life
In one of his last interviews, Díez left a message for his audience: "I want everyone to know how grateful I am for the love, respect and consideration they have always given me.  I say out loud that I have the biggest thrill to see that you still listen with pleasure, so I will sing until I run out of strength to do it."

Barbarito Díez died in 1995 from diabetes-related complications at age 85.

Partial list of recorded songs

International tours

Dominican Republic
Backed by Antonio María Romeu orchestra (1958)

Mexico
Backed by the Charanga Típica de Conciertos led by Guillermo Rubalcaba (1981; 1985)

Puerto Rico
Backed by Septeto Gloria Mantancera (1933)

United States
Backed by Antonio María Romeu orchestra (1959, New York City; 1960, Miami)

Venezuela
 All backed by his orchestra
Poliedro de Caracas (1980)
InterContinental Tamanaco, Caracas (1980)
Caracas, Barquisimeto and Maracay (1981), sharing stage with Orquesta Aragón, Grupo Son 14 de Adalberto Álvarez, and El Trabuco Venezolano led by Alberto Naranjo
Caracas Athenaeum (1984), sharing stage with Pablo Milanés and other Cuban artists

See also
Paulina Álvarez

References

1909 births
1995 deaths
20th-century Cuban male singers
Cuban bandleaders
Bolero singers
Danzón singers
Deaths from diabetes
People from Matanzas Province